Petracola waka is a species of lizard in the family Gymnophthalmidae. It is endemic to Peru.

References

Petracola
Reptiles of Peru
Endemic fauna of Peru
Reptiles described in 2008
Taxa named by David A. Kizirian
Taxa named by Sarah Bayefsky-Anand
Taxa named by April Eriksson
Taxa named by Minh Le (herpetologist)
Taxa named by Maureen Ann Donnelly